Ontario North was a federal electoral district represented in the House of Commons of Canada from 1867 to 1925. It was located in the province of Ontario. It was created by the British North America Act of 1867.

The North Riding of Ontario initially consisted of the Townships of Reach, Uxbridge, Brock, Scott, Thorah, Mara, Rama and Scugog.  In 1882, it was redefined to exclude the townships of Reach and Uxbridge, and to include the townships of Morrison, Ryde, Draper, Oakley, Macaulay, Maclean and Ridout and the villages of Bracebridge and Cannington. In 1892, "North Ontario" was defined to exclude the township of Scugog, and to include the village of Beaverton.  In 1903, it was redefined to consist of the townships of Brock, Mara, Rama, Scott, Thora and Uxbridge, the town of Uxbridge, and the villages of Beaverton and Cannington.

The electoral district was abolished in 1924 when it was merged into Muskoka—Ontario riding.

Electoral history

See also 

 List of Canadian federal electoral districts
 Past Canadian electoral districts

References

External links 

 Website of the Parliament of Canada

Former federal electoral districts of Ontario